Xing may refer to:

 an abbreviation for crossing such as Pedestrian Xing or Wildlife Xing, primarily used in North America
 Chinese surname (姓, xing)
 Xing (surname) (邢), a Chinese surname
 Xing (state), a state of ancient China during the Zhou Dynasty (1046–221 BCE)
 Xing County, in Shanxi, China
 Qiao Xing Universal Telephone Inc. (NASDAQ: XING)
 XING, a social network platform
 Xing Technology, known for the Xing Player
Xing (cultural organization), cultural organization based in Bologna
 Xing, a fictional country mentioned in the manga and anime Fullmetal Alchemist, home of Ling Yao, Lan Fan, Fu, and May Chang.
 Xing, the Ancient Chinese conception of human nature